The Nagas are a divine, or semi-divine, race of half-human, half-serpent beings that reside in the netherworld (Patala), and can occasionally take human or part-human form, or are so depicted in art. A female naga is called a Nagi, or a Nagini. According to legend, they are the children of the sage Kashyapa and Kadru. Rituals devoted to these supernatural beings have been taking place throughout South Asia for at least 2,000 years. They are principally depicted in three forms: as entirely human with snakes on the heads and necks, as common serpents, or as half-human, half-snake beings in Hinduism, Buddhism, and Jainism.

Nagaraja is the title given to the king of the nagas. Narratives of these beings hold cultural significance in the mythological traditions of many South Asian and Southeast Asian cultures, and within Hinduism and Buddhism. Communities such as the Nagavanshi Kshatriyas claim descent from this race.

Etymology 

Sometimes the word  is also used generically to mean "snake". The word is cognate with English 'snake', Germanic: *snēk-a-, Proto-IE: *(s)nēg-o- (with s-mobile).

Hinduism 

The mythological serpent race that often take form as cobras can often be found in Hindu iconography. The nagas are described as the powerful, splendid, wonderful, and proud semi-divine race that can assume their physical form either as human, a partial human-serpent, or as a whole serpent. Their domain is in the enchanted underworld, the underground realm filled with gems, gold and other earthly treasures called Naga-loka or Patala-loka. They are also often associated with bodies of waters — including rivers, lakes, seas, and wells — and are guardians of treasure. Their power and venom made them potentially dangerous to humans. However, in Hindu mythology, they often take the role of beneficial protagonists; in the Samudra Manthana, Vasuki, a nagaraja who abides on Shiva's neck, became the churning rope for churning of the Ocean of Milk. Their eternal mortal foe is the Garuḍa, the legendary semi-divine bird-like deity.
 
Vishnu is originally portrayed in the form sheltered by Sheshanāga or reclining on Shesha, but the iconography has been extended to other deities as well. The serpent is a common feature in Ganesha iconography, and appears in many forms: around the neck, use as a sacred thread wrapped around the stomach as a belt, held in a hand, coiled at the ankles, or as a throne. Shiva is often shown garlanded with a snake. Maehle (2006: p. 297) states that "Patanjali is thought to be a manifestation of the serpent of eternity".

Literature 

The Mahabharata epic is the first text that introduces nagas, describes them in detail and narrates their stories. The cosmic snake Shesha, the nagarajas (naga kings) Vasuki, Takshaka, Airavata and Karkotaka, and the princess Ulupi, are all depicted in the Mahabharata.

The Brahma Purana describes the reign of Adishesha as the king of the serpents in Patala:

The Kamba Ramayana describes the role of Vasuki in the Samudra Manthana:

The Devi Bhagavata Purana describes the legend of Manasa:

Buddhism 

As in Hinduism, the Buddhist nāga generally has sometimes been portrayed as a human being with a snake or dragon extending over his head. One nāga, in human form, attempted to become a monk; and when telling it that such ordination was impossible, the Buddha told it how to ensure that it would be reborn a human, and so able to become a monk.

The nagas are believed to both live on Nagaloka, among the other minor deities, and in various parts of the human-inhabited earth. Some of them are water-dwellers, living in streams or the ocean; others are earth-dwellers, living in caverns.

They act as a guard upon Mount Sumeru, protecting the dēvas of Trāyastriṃśa from attack by the asuras.

Among the notable nagas of Buddhist tradition is Mucalinda, nagaraja and protector of the Buddha. In the Vinaya Sutra (I, 3), shortly after his enlightenment, the Buddha is meditating in a forest when a great storm arises, but graciously, King Mucalinda gives shelter to the Buddha from the storm by covering the Buddha's head with his seven snake heads. Then the king takes the form of a young Brahmin and renders the Buddha homage.

In the Vajrayāna and Mahāsiddha traditions, nagas in their half-human form are depicted holding a nagas-jewel, kumbhas of amrita, or a terma that had been elementally encoded by adepts.

The two chief disciples of the Buddha, Sariputta and Moggallāna are both referred to as Mahānāga or "Great nāga". Some of the most important figures in Buddhist history symbolize nagas in their names such as Dignāga, Nāgāsēna, and, although other etymons are assigned to his name, Nāgārjuna.

Literature 

The Nāga Saṃyutta of the Pali Canon consists of suttas specifically devoted to explaining nature of the nagas.

In the "Devadatta" chapter of the Lotus Sutra, the daughter of the dragon king, an eight year old longnü (龍女), after listening to Mañjuśrī preach the Lotus Sutra, transforms into a male Bodhisattva and immediately reaches full enlightenment. Some say this tale appears to reinforce the viewpoint prevalent in Mahayana scriptures that a male body is required for Buddhahood, even if a being is so advanced in realization that they can magically transform their body at will and demonstrate the emptiness of the physical form itself. However, many schools of Buddhism and classical, seminal Chinese exegeses interpret the story to repudiate this viewpoint, stating the story demonstrates that women can attain Buddhahood in their current form.

According to tradition, the Prajñapāramita sutras had been given by the Buddha to a great nāga who guarded them in the sea, and were conferred upon Nāgārjuna later.

Other traditions 
In Thailand and Java, the nāga is a wealthy underworld deity. For Malay sailors, nagas are a type of dragon with many heads. In Laos they are beaked water serpents. In Tibet, they are said to be found in waterways and underground locations, and are susceptible to the suffering caused by humans’ carelessness towards the natural environment, often reacting to such actions. In Pakistan, many films and stories (see Jadoo Garni) are based around a shape-shifting snake-woman, descended from the Vedic traditions. It is still a popular folk icon in Pakistani pop culture, folk tales and music.

Sri Lanka 

The Naga people were believed to be an ancient tribe and origins of Sri Lanka. According to V. Kanakasabhai, the Oliyar, Parathavar, Maravar and Eyinar, who were widespread across South India and North-East Sri Lanka, are all Naga tribes. There are references to them in several ancient texts such as Mahavamsa, Manimekalai and also in other Sanskrit and Pali literature. They are generally represented as a class of superhumans taking the form of serpents who inhabit a subterranean world. Texts such as Manimekalai represent them as persons in human form.

Cambodia 

Stories of nagas have existed for thousands of years in the Khmer society since the Funan era. According to reports by two Chinese envoys, Kang Tai and Zhu Ying, the state of Funan was established in the 1st century CE by an Indian prince named Kaundinya I, who married a Nāga princess named Soma (Chinese: Liuye; "Willow Leaf"). They are symbolized in the story of Preah Thong and Neang Neak.
Kaundinya was given instruction in a dream to take a magic bow from a temple and defeat a Nāga princess named Soma, the daughter of the Nāga king. They fell in love during the battle and later married, their lineage becoming the royal dynasty of Funan. Kaundinya later built a capital, Vyadhapura, and the kingdom came to be known as Kambujadeśa or Cambodia.
The love story is the source of many standard practices in modern-day Khmer culture, including wedding ceremonies and other rituals.
The Khmer people believe they are the descendants of the nagas. Many Khmer people still believe they exist, and will one day reappear, coming back home bringing prosperity for their people.

Although many temples from the Funan Era had been destroyed through wars, nature and time, nagas can still be seen in ancient temples from the Chenla Era and the Angkor Era. For example, like the temple modern day named "The Coiled nagas Temple" was once called, "Emperor's Wealth Temple" .

Nāga in the Khmer culture represent rain, or a bridge between the mortal realm and the realm of devas (Heaven; /), and they can transform into half human or fully human. They act as protectors from invisible forces, deities, or other humans with malicious intention. Furthermore, Cambodian Nāga possess numerological symbolism in the middle of their heads. Odd-headed Nāga symbolize masculinity, infinity, timelessness, and immortality. This is because, numerologically, all odd numbers come from the number one (១). Seven-headed Nāga are said to be representing femininity, physicality, mortality, temporality, and the Earth. Odd headed nagas are believed to represent immortality and are carved and used throughout Cambodia.

Odd-Headed Nāga (Name, origin, and connotations):
    
-1 Headed Nāga: mostly seen in modern days; carved on objects as protection, temples, monastery, King's residence, residence of a deity (អទីទេព)

Symbolizes, that even if everything in this world is gone, there's still this Nāga left bringing victory and happiness to all
    
-3 Kalyak: born between the mortal realm and devas' realm, they live at the bottom of the ocean and is the guardian of wealth, often depicted as evil (nothing to do with the symbolism)

Symbolizes the Trimurti; (left Vishnu, middle Shiva and right Brahma) but also the three realm [heaven (devas' realm), earth (mortal realm) and hell (norok realm)]. In Buddhism, the central head represents Buddha, the right head represents Dharma and the left one represents the monks.
         
-5 Anontak/Sesak: born out of the elemental elements on Earth, they're immortals

Symbolizes the directions; East, West, North, South and Middle (Ganges river, Indus river, Yamuna river, Brahmaputra river (Brahma's Son River), Sarasvati river). In Buddhism, the dragon heads represent the 5 Buddhas: Kadabak, Kunsontho, Koneakumno, Samnak Koudom Gautama Buddha and Seare Metrey.
         
-7 Muchlentak: originated from the bottom of the Himalayas, they bring peace and prosperity to humans, they're deities who control the seven oceans and seven mountains called 'Seytontaraksatakboriphorn.' They are also the Nāga that sheltered Gautama Buddha for 7 days and 7 nights (Mucalinda). Often depicted as guardian statues, carved as balustrades on causeways leading to main Khmer temples, such as those found in Angkor Wat. They also represent the seven races within Naga society, which has a mythological, or symbolic, association with "the seven colors of the rainbow."

Symbolizes the Sun, the Moon and five other planets; ចន្ទ (Moon)[also Monday] អង្គារ (Mars)[Tuesday] ពុធ (Mercury)[Wednesday] ព្រហស្បតិ៍ (Jupiter)[Thursday] សុក្រ (Venus)[Friday] សៅរ៍ (Saturn)[Saturday] អាទិត្យ (Sun)[Sunday]
    
-9 Vasukak: Is the king who rules the Earth (Vasuki). For this Nāga, when carved on both sides, the front heads represent reincarnation and the behind represent death.

Symbolizes power of the nine immortals of the universe; power of the lighting and thunder of the East (ទិសបូព៌ា), power of the fire of the Southeast (ទិសអាគ្នេយ៍), power of the law and order of the South (ទិសខាងត្បូង), power of the spirits and demonic creatures of the Southwest (ទិសនារតី), power of the rain of the West (ទិសខាងលិច), power of the wind of the Northwest (ទិសពាយព្យ), power of the wealth and aesthetic of the North (ទិសឧត្តរ), power of destruction of the Northeast (ទិសឥសាន្ត), power of Brahma (creation and preservation) in the middle (កណ្តាល).

In Vedas and shramanism, there are four different Nāga race:

1) Primitive Dragons such as the European dragon who can spit fire.

2) The Spiritual Dragons who are the guardians of wealth, they protect treasure in the ocean. They can take on a half human form.

3) The Divine nagas, who can travel to heaven, they came from Lord Indra's realm (the divine realm), they can take on a full human form.

4) The Supreme and Divine nagas, like Vasuki the follower of Lord Shiva, who alone can fight all the Garuḍa race.
         
All of them have great powers and can set off storms, rain, tempest and create lands from the sea.

Indonesia

In Javanese and Balinese culture, Indonesia, a nāga is depicted as a crowned, giant, magical serpent, sometimes winged. It is similarly derived from the Shiva-Hinduism tradition, merged with Javanese animism. The nāga in Indonesia mainly derived and influenced by Indic tradition, combined with the native animism tradition of sacred serpents. In Sanskrit, the term nāga literally means snake, but in Java it normally refer to serpent deity, associated with water and fertility. In Borobudur, the nagas are depicted in their human form, but elsewhere they are depicted in animal shape.

Early depictions of circa-9th-century Central Java closely resembled Indic nāga which was based on imagery of cobras. During this period, nāga-serpents were depicted as giant cobras supporting the waterspout of yoni-lingam. The examples of nāga-sculpture can be found in several Javanese candis, including Prambanan, Sambisari, Ijo, and Jawi. In East Java, the Penataran temple complex contain a Candi Nāga, an unusual nāga-temple with its Hindu-Javanese caryatids holding corpulent nagas aloft.

The later depiction since the 15th century, however, was slightly influenced by Chinese dragon imagery—although unlike its Chinese counterparts, Javanese and Balinese nagas do not have legs. Nāga as the lesser deity of earth and water is prevalent in the Hindu period of Indonesia, before the introduction of Islam.

In Balinese tradition, nagas are often depicted battling garuḍas. Intricately carved nagas are found as stairs railings in bridges or stairs, such as those found in Balinese temples, Ubud monkey forest, and Taman Sari in Yogyakarta.

In a wayang theater story, a snake-like god (nāga) named Sanghyang Anantaboga or Antaboga is a guardian deity in the bowels of the earth. nagas symbolize the nether realm of earth or underworld.

Laos 
The Nāga is believed to live in the Laotian stretch of the Mekong or its estuaries. Lao mythology maintains that the nagas are the protectors of Vientiane, and by extension, the Lao state. The association with nagas was most clearly articulated during and immediately after the reign of Anouvong. An important poem from this period San Leupphasun discusses relations between Laos and Thailand in a veiled manner, using the Nāga and the Garuḍa to represent the Lao and the Thai, respectively. The Nāga is incorporated extensively into Lao iconography, and features prominently in Lao culture throughout the length of the country, not only in Vientiane.

Thailand 
Phaya Nak or Phaya Nāga (phaya derived from Mon which mean high nobility) or Nakkharat  in Thai beliefs, nagas are considered the patronage of water. nagas are believed to live in either water bodies or in caves. According to a popular legend, the Mekong River in north-eastern Thailand and Laos was said to be created by two Nāga kings slithering through the area, thus creating the Mekong and the nearby Nan River. The Mekong is synonymous with the unexplained fireballs phenomenon which has long been believed to be created by the nagas that dwell in the river. Common explanations of their sightings have been attributed to oarfish, elongated fish with red crests; however, these are exclusively marine and usually live at great depths.

In November 2022, the Thai government declared the Naga as the national symbol of Thailand, with the aim of promoting Thai culture and traditions and increasing the country's cultural capital to drive the creative economy. The Naga is a mythical creature with long-standing beliefs and connections to the Thai people, and its designation as a national symbol is a significant step towards preserving and promoting Thai culture. The National Culture Commission and the Fine Arts Department developed a prototype image of the Naga that accurately represents Thai beliefs and traditions related to the creature. The prototype image features the four families of Nagas, each with its unique color, and the largest Naga, Nak Vasuki, who is related to Buddhism and the Thai monarchy, The Naga is also believed to be a symbol of water and fertility and serves as a guardian of Buddhism.

Due to the strong relation with everything water, the Nāga in Thai belief does also play a role in rain control. The concept of Nak hai nam (lit. Nāga granting water) is used for annual rainfall prediction. It is still practiced nowadays, most notably during the Royal Ploughing Ceremony. The oracle ranges from 1 nak hai nam (1 Nāga granted water); meaning the abundant rainfall should be observed that year, to maximum 7 nak hai nam (7 nagas granted water); meaning there might not be adequate rainfall that year.

In northern Thailand, the Singhanavati Kingdom had a strong connection with nagas. The kingdom was believed to be built with aids of nagas, and thus, nagas were highly reverend by the royal family. The kingdom, for a period of time, was renamed Yonok Nāga Rāj (lit. Yonok the nagaraja)

The nagas are also highly revered. The Buddhist temples and palaces are often adorned with various nagas. The term Nāga is also present in various Thai architecture terms including the nak sadung (นาคสะดุ้ง, the outer roof finial component featuring Nāga-like structure), and the nak than (นาคทันต์, the corbel with Nāga-shape). Moreover, nagas are sometimes linked to medicine. The naga Vasuki is present in the legend of the Samudra Manthana, in which Dhanvantari (god of Ayurveda) and amrita (the elixir of eternal life) were churned from the Ocean of Milk. The nagas can also be founded substituting the snakes in either Rod of Asclepius or mistakenly Caduceus of several medical institutions' symbols. The former seal of Faculty of Medicine, Srinakharinwirot University, and the seal of Society of Medical Student Thailand are some notable examples using the Caduceus with nagas' presence instead of snakes.

Folklore 
Thai folklore holds the Phaya nagas to be semi-divine, demi-creatures, which possess supernatural powers as has been described in Buddhist and Hindu cosmology. The  "Kamchanod Forest" (ป่าคำชะโนด) Ban Dung district, Udon Thani province, which is held in high reverence and fear across Thailand, is believed to be the border between the human world and the netherworld, and is frequently depicted in Thai folklore as the site of many hauntings, but more frequently is considered to be the home of the Nāga.

According to Shan folklore of Nánzhào Kingdom (now southern China and Southeast Asia during the 8th and 9th centuries, which was centered on present-day Yúnnán in China), the Nāga inhabited the Ěrhǎi lake and is the creator of the Mekong. In China, the Nāga (Chinese: 那伽) is generally more considered to be a dragon.

Appearance 
Many people, particularly in Isan (the north-eastern region of Thailand), believe that the nagas are responsible for unnatural wave phenomena occurring in the rivers or lakes in the vicinity. It is also frequently claimed that the serpent-like demigods are responsible for marks on common objects, such as car hoods or house walls.

A police office has also claimed to be in contact with the Nāga, although the implications of this contact is not thoroughly explained.

In attempts to explain these phenomena, scientists and researchers at the Faculty of Science of Chulalongkorn University have attributed these seemingly preternatural phenomena to standing waves in water, and posit that the existence of the Phaya Nāga is similar to belief in Loch Ness Monster in Scotland or Ogopogo in Canada, and further maintain that the serpent-like tracks of the Phaya Nāga are very possibly forged by humans.

Malaysia 

In Malay and Orang Asli traditions, the lake Chini, located in Pahang is home to a Nāga called Sri Gumum. Depending on legend versions, her predecessor Sri Pahang or her son left the lake and later fought a Nāga called Sri Kemboja. Kemboja is the Malay name for Cambodia. Like the Nāga-legends there, there are stories about an ancient empire in lake Chini, although the stories are not linked to the Nāga-legends.

Philippines 

The indigenous Bakunawa, a serpent-like moon-eating creature in Philippine mythology, was syncretized with the Nāga. It is believed to be the cause of eclipses, earthquakes, rains, and wind. The movements of the bakunawa served as a geomantic calendar system for ancient Filipinos and were part of the shamanistic rituals of the babaylan. It is usually depicted with a characteristically looped tail and was variously believed to inhabit either the sea, the sky, or the underworld.
However, the bakunawa may have also syncretized with the Hindu deities, Rahu and Ketu, the navagraha of eclipses.

Examples 
 Adishesha, on whom Vishnu is in yoga nidra (Ananta shayana)
 Vasuki, the king of nagas and who coils over Shiva's neck and offered to serve as the rope to pull Mount Mandara in the Samudra Manthana (Churning of the Ocean of Milk) to release the amrita (nectar of the immortality).
 Kaliya, a snake conquered by Krishna
 Manasa, the Hindu goddess of Nagas and curer of snake-bite and sister of Vasuki
 Takshaka, the tribal king of the nagas
 Ulupi, a companion of Arjuna in the epic Mahabharata
 Karkotaka, a naga king in Indian mythology who controls weather, that lived in a forest near Nishadha Kingdom and bit Nala at the request of Indra controls weather
 Mucalinda, a nāga in Buddhism who protected the Gautama Buddha from the elements after his enlightenment
 Padmavati, the Nāgī queen & companion of Dharanendra
Apalala, Nāga in Buddhist mythology
 Shwe Nabay (Naga Medaw), a goddess or a Nat spirit in Burmese animistic mythology, who is believed to have married a Naga and died from heartbreak after he left her
 Paravataksha, his sword causes earthquakes and his roar caused thunder.
 Naga Seri Gumum, who lives in Tasik Chini, a freshwater lake in Pahang, Malaysia
 Yulong, the Dragon King of the West Sea in the Chinese classical novel Journey to the West, becomes a naga after completing his journey with Xuanzang
 Bakunawa, a dragon in Philippine mythology that is often represented as a gigantic sea serpent. Nagas are also present in Kapampangan polytheistic beliefs, such as Lakandanum. (See Deities of Philippine mythology.)
 Antaboga, the world serpent in Javanese and Balinese mythology of Indonesia, who created the world turtle Bedawang where the world resides on its back

In popular culture 

 Several Bollywood films have been made about female nagas, including Nagin (1954), Nagin (1976), Nagina (1986), Nigahen (1989), Jaani Dushman: Ek Anokhi Kahani (2002), Hisss (2010)
 Counter-Strike: Global Offensive also features the Naga skin on the iconic Desert Eagle pistol
In television series like Naaginn (2007-2009) and Naagin (2015 TV series), naagin takes revenge of her loved one's death.
The Japanese anime and manga series, Slayers (1989), has a principal character named Naga the Serpent (introduced in 1990). 
In the Telugu film Devi (1999), a Nagini played by Prema comes to Earth to protect a woman who saves her when she was in the snake form. She eventually falls in love with a human. 
In J. K. Rowling's Wizarding World, Nagini is one of Voldemort's horcruxes in the Harry Potter series and a Maledictus, a carrier of blood curse, in the 2018 film Fantastic Beasts: The Crimes of Grindlewald. Her curse allows her to change into a snake and back into a human, but her snake form eventually becomes permanent.
 In the 1998 film Jungle Boy, the Naga is depicted as a large cobra deity that grants the gift of understanding all languages to those who are pure of heart and punishes those who are not pure of heart in different ways.
 The Nagas are antagonists in the cartoon The Secret Saturdays. They served the ancient Sumerian cryptid Kur and attempted to push Zak Saturday into the dark side after learning that he was Kur reincarnated, but eventually served V.V. Argost when he gained his own Kur powers.
Nagas appear in the Dungeons & Dragons roleplaying game, depicted as massive serpents with human heads.
 The Nagas appear in the Warcraft franchise. They are depicted as ancient night elves that have snake-like tails in place of legs, and have other serpentine features such as scales and fins. The Nagas came to be when they were transformed from the ancient night elves by the Old Gods. Their queen Azshara is described as a demigoddess.
 Nagas also appear in The Battle for Wesnoth, and are depicted as a more snakelike counterpart to the merfolk, who are often their enemies.
 Magic: The Gathering'''s 2014-2015 block, set on the plane of Tarkir, featured Naga as humanoid snakes versed in powerful venoms and poisons with two arms and no other appendages. They are aligned with the Sultai clan in the sets, Khans of Tarkir and Fate Reforged, and with the Silumgar clan in the Dragons of Tarkir set.
Naga are featured in The Silent Bells, the fourth book in N. D. Wilson's Ashtown Burials series.
Many Lakorn (Thai television soap opera) are based on a Phaya Naga legend, such as Poot Mae Nam Khong (ภูติแม่น้ำโขง) in 2008, Manisawat (มณีสวาท) in 2013 or Nakee (นาคี) in 2016.
A search for the Phaya Naga was recently featured in a Destination Truth episode on the SyFy (formerly Sci-Fi Channel) series in Series 01 (episode 02).
The dragons in Raya and the Last Dragon are based on the Phaya Naga.
A serpent god named Nāga is featured in the 2021 animated film Batman: Soul of the Dragon''.
Hearthstone, a digital card game by Blizzard Entertainment, incorporated Naga as a minion type in its Battlegrounds game mode on May 10, 2022.

Gallery

See also 

 Ichchadhari naag and naagin (shape-shifting cobra)
 List of Nāgas
 Naga Kingdom
 Nagvanshi
 Naga people (Lanka)
 Nagarjuna
 Lamia
 Serpent (symbolism)
 Snake worship
 Naga Viper pepper
 Phra Lak Phra Lam
 Rocket Festival

Notes

References

Further reading

External links 

Nagiana (a site dedicated to Nāga ancestors)
nagas in the Pali Canon
 nagas
 Image of a Seven-Headed Nāga
 nagas and Serpents
 Depictions of Nagas in the area of Angkor Wat in Cambodia
 nagas and Naginis: Serpent Figures in Hinduism and Buddhism
Mekong River Commission paper on eels
Dr. Kanoksilpa, a pediatrician at Nong Khai hospital, studied this phenomenon for four years and concludes the most likely explanation to be seasonal accumulations of methane gas

 
 
Buddhist deities
Dragons
Hindu legendary creatures
Legendary serpents
Mythological monsters
Non-human races in Hindu mythology
Sea and river gods
Shapeshifting
Tutelary deities

km:នាគ